Norape puella is a moth of the Megalopygidae family. It was described by Francis Walker in 1855.

References

Moths described in 1855
Megalopygidae